The Bijou Theater (often referred to as The Bijou) was a gay adult theater and sex club in Chicago's Old Town neighborhood. The Bijou Theater opened in 1970 and it was the longest-running gay adult theater and sex club in the United States. The Bijou Theater featured the "Bijou Classics"—adult films produced by Bijou Video in the 1970s and 1980s—every Monday. The theater also hosted live shows featuring adult entertainers, a non-sexual cabaret show written and directed by drag entertainer Miss Tiger and special appearances by gay porn stars. The theater permanently closed its door on September 30, 2015.

Description

Theater
The Bijou Theater featured a 15-by-18-foot silver screen and seats 77 people in anchored, theater-style cushioned seating. The theater's lobby hosted a DVD counter to purchase gay adult films. A desk and computer were set up for patrons who would like to peruse the Bijou's website listing over 14,000 titles. Titles found on the website were then available for purchase at the DVD counter.

Sex club
The Bijou Theater was widely recognized for its second-floor sex club. Travel magazines implored readers to explore the "gay man's fantasy playground" replete with glory holes, dark corners, and a BDSM dungeon with slings, crosses, and other fetish objects. Guests were invited to rent a locker to store their street clothes and change into their "play clothing". In warm weather, the club opened the Bijou Gardens, an outdoor playground.

Bijou Boys Erotic Cabaret 
The Bijou Boys Erotic Cabaret featured solo performances by local and national male dancers.  Performances featured full nudity and there were typically three to four dancers a show.  Showtimes were select afternoons and nightly.  The cabaret began to shift from typical go-go boy show to an avant garde, high production value venue under the direction of Miss Tiger.  Eventually, these more explicit shows were separated from a newly formed venue known as Miss Tiger's Cabaret.

Miss Tiger's Cabaret 
Miss Tiger's Cabaret featured live singing, original music and original plays.  The cabaret shows were written and directed by Miss Tiger and were the first of their kind to be performed at Bijou Theater.  New shows were introduced about every eight weeks; with productions taking place Thursdays through Saturdays at 8:30pm and 10:30pm each night.  This cabaret was unlike the former Bijou cabaret, due to its including both a male and female cast and featured very little nudity.  Cast members included a few of the dancers from the erotic cabaret but were mostly singers and actors from Chicago's thriving community theater scene.  Original music was created by Chicago music producer, DJ Christian, who often accompanied Miss Tiger in music bookings outside of the theater.  Each production featured theatrical lighting, original costumes and set design.  Many shows were photographed and reviewed by St. Sukie de la Croix of the Windy City Times.  Sukie was quoted as saying, "Miss Tiger is a star!  Nobody else is doing this kind of thing."  Miss Tiger would later write a popular advice column for Nightspots, a weekly Chicago LGBTQIA entertainment magazine.

Miss Tiger's Cabaret was irreverent, camp, sometimes political and thought provoking all in one.  Miss Tiger's comedic timing and ability to involve the audience into the show was legendary.  The diversity and inclusiveness featured in these productions garnered a following of show goers, that often included heterosexual men, women and couples, who would have otherwise never visited Bijou Theater.

Shows ran from 2000 through 2004.

Ownership
The Bijou Theater was owned and operated by American pornographer Steven Toushin. In 1989, at the Adult Video Awards show in Las Vegas Toushin received (while he was in prison) the Reuben Sturman Award "For Legal Battles on Behalf of the Adult Industry". In 2007, at the GayVN award show in San Francisco, Toushin was awarded the "Life Time Achievement Award" from the Gay Adult Industry. He is the 3rd person to ever receive this honor. In the June 2008 AVN (Adult Video News) magazine's 25th anniversary edition Toushin was acknowledged as one of the 25 pioneers who developed the Gay/bi Adult Film Industry. Toushin was inducted into the Founders Branch of the Adult Video News Hall of Fame at the 2009 AVN Award Show in Las Vegas, Nevada. Other Founders include Phil Harvey and Larry Flynt.

See also
 LGBT culture in Chicago

References

External links 

LGBT culture in Chicago
Landmarks in Chicago
LGBT erotica
Adult movie theaters